was a Japanese samurai of the Sengoku period through early Azuchi-Momoyama Period, who was the fifth son of Oda Nobunaga. 

At a very young age, Katsunaga, then known as "Gobomaru", was given in adoption to Toyama Kagetou and his wife, Lady Otsuya, at Iwamura Castle.  Lady Otsuya was Oda Nobunaga's aunt.  In 1572, the castle was captured by Takeda forces under Akiyama Nobutomo, and Gobomaru, then four years old, became a hostage of the Takeda. 

In 1581, Takeda Katsuyori released Gobomaru (Katsunaga) to the Oda clan, who returned him to Iwamura Castle, which had been re-taken during his absence.

Honnō-ji Incident
One year later in 1582, Katsunaga accompanied his father to Honnō-ji. Following the attack on Honno-ji and the death of Nobunaga, Akechi Mitsuhide attacked Nijō Castle, where Nobunaga's son Nobutada was staying.  During the fight, Katsunaga was killed and Nobutada committed seppuku.

Family
Father: Oda Nobunaga (1536-1582)
 Brothers:
 Oda Nobutada (1557-1582)
 Oda Nobukatsu (1558-1630)
 Oda Nobutaka (1558-1583)
 Hashiba Hidekatsu (1567-1585)
 Oda Nobuhide (1571-1597)
 Oda Nobutaka (1576-1602)
 Oda Nobuyoshi (1573-1615)
 Oda Nobusada (1574-1624)
 Oda Nobuyoshi (died 1609)
 Oda Nagatsugu (died 1600)
 Oda Nobumasa (1554-1647)
 Sisters:
 Tokuhime (1559-1636)
 Fuyuhime (1561-1641)
 Hideko (died 1632)
 Eihime (1574-1623)
 Hōonin
 Sannomarudono(d. 1603)
 Tsuruhime

References
 http://www2s.biglobe.ne.jp/~gokuh/ghp/matsuei/ko_05.htm
 http://members2.tsukaeru.net/tono/y-busyou%2015oon.html
 http://www.sengokujidai.net/odanobunaga/

1568 births
1582 deaths
Samurai
Oda clan
Japanese warriors killed in battle